Lake Baringo Airport  is an airport located on the western shores of Lake Baringo, Kenya. It received its first commercial flights in January 2016.

History 
In January 2016, Fly-SAX began flights to Lake Baringo from Nairobi–Wilson, thereby inaugurating commercial service at the airport. Flights operate twice a week using Cessna 208 Caravan aircraft. The new service has given a boost to the Baringo County tourism industry.

Airlines and destinations

See also
 
 
 List of airports in Kenya

References

External links 
 Lake Baringo Airport at the Great Circle Mapper

Baringo County
Airports in Rift Valley Province